Jay Lawrence Westbrook (born 1947) is an American politician of the Democratic Party in Cleveland, Ohio.  For 34 years, he was a member of Cleveland City Council representing wards on the west side of Cleveland.  He was first elected to council in 1980 and served as its president from 1990 to 1999.  He retired from Council on December 31, 2013.  He currently works for the Thriving Communities program of the Western Reserve Land Conservancy.

External links
Where Are They Now: Jay Westbrook

1947 births
Living people
Cleveland City Council members